Patil Puttappa (14 January 1921 – 16 March 2020) was an Indian writer, veteran journalist and activist based in Hubli, India. He was the founder-editor of the now-defunct Kannada daily Vishwavani and weekly Prapancha.

Puttappa, was in the forefront of the agitation in the late 1940s and 1950s demanding the unification of areas where Kannadigas were in a majority. He was the president of the Dharwad-based Karnataka Vidyavardhaka Sangha for over 30 years. He represented the State in the Rajya Sabha for two terms (1962 to 1974). He was also the first president of the Kannada Watchdog Committee that was later renamed as the Kannada Development Authority.

Puttappa was President of the 70th Kannada Sahitya Sammelana held at Belgaum in 2003. Puttappa also spoke at the valedictory function of the second World Kannada Meet (Vishwa Kannada Sammelana) held in Belgaum.

He held a master's degree in Journalism from California State University in 1949.

Publications 
He has authored many Kannada language books such as
 Karnatakada Kavi Lekhakaru
 Karnataka Sangeetha Kalaratnaru
 Badukalu Beku Badukuva Ee Maathu
 Neevu Nagabeku
 Nenapina Butti
 Mathu Manikya
 Kannadada Kampu
 Suvarna Karnataka
 Pustaka Samskriti

Awards 
 Nadoja Award - Kannada University
 Nrupatunga award - 2008, Literary award By Karnataka Sahitya Parishat 
 Wooday award - 2010

References 

1921 births
2020 deaths
Journalists from Karnataka
People from Dharwad
Rajya Sabha members from Karnataka
California State University, Los Angeles alumni